The Free University of Berlin (often abbreviated as FU Berlin or simply FU) is a public research university in Berlin, Germany. It emphasizes on political science and the humanities. The university utilizes its German name without translation on its English-language website. 

The Free University of Berlin was founded in West Berlin in 1948 with American support during the early Cold War period as a Western continuation of the Friedrich Wilhelm University, or the University of Berlin, whose traditions and faculty members it retained. The Friedrich Wilhelm University (which was renamed the Humboldt University), being in East Berlin, faced strong communist repression; the Free University's name referred to West Berlin's status as part of the so-called Western Free World, a propaganda term to point out the contrast to communist-controlled East Berlin.

In 2008, as part of a joint effort, the Free University of Berlin, along with the Hertie School of Governance, and WZB Social Science Research Center Berlin, created the Berlin Graduate School for Transnational Studies.

As one of Germany's most prestigious institutions of higher education, the Free University of Berlin was conferred the title of "University of Excellence" under the German Universities Excellence Initiative, of which it is part. As an institution of the Berlin University Alliance, the FU Berlin was included in the second funding line in 2019 as part of the Excellence Strategy.

History

The Free University of Berlin was established by students and scholars on 4 December 1948. The foundation is strongly connected to the beginning of the Cold War period.

The University of Berlin was located in the former Soviet sector of Berlin and was granted permission to continue teaching by the Soviet Military Administration in Germany (SMAD) in January 1946. The university came under increased communist influence and repression, as it became a battlefield for the political disputes of the postwar period. This led to protests by students critical of the prevailing system. Between 1945 and 1948, more than 18 students were brutally beaten and arrested or persecuted, and some were even executed by the Soviet secret police (NKVD).

Foundation (1948–2000)

At the end of 1947, students demanded a university free from political influence. The climax of the protests was reached on 23 April 1948: after three students were expelled from the university without a trial, about 2,000 students protested at the Hotel Esplanade. By the end of April, the governor of the United States Army Lucius D. Clay gave the order to legally examine the formation of a new university in the western sectors of Berlin. On 19 June 1948, the "preparatory committee for establishing a free university" consisting of politicians, professors, administrative staff members and students, met. With a manifesto titled "Request for establishing a free university in Berlin", the committee appealed to the public for support.

The municipal authorities of Berlin granted the foundation of a free university and requested the opening for the coming 1948/49 winter semester. Meanwhile, the students' committee in the German Democratic Republic protested against the formation, the GDR described the new university as the "so-called free university" in official documents until the fall of the Berlin Wall.

The council-manager government accepted the by-law on 4 November 1948. The by-law achieved prominence under its alias "the Berlin model":
The university was founded as a statutory corporation (Körperschaft des öffentlichen Rechts) and was not directly subjected to the state, as it was controlled by a supervisory board consisting of six representatives of the state of Berlin, three representatives of the university and students. This form was unique in Germany at that time, as the students had much more influence on the system than before. Until the 1970s, the involvement of the students in the committees was slowly cut back while adapting to the model of the western German universities in order to be fully recognized as an equivalent university.

On 15 November 1948, the first lectures were held in the buildings of the Kaiser Wilhelm Society for the Advancement of Science. The actual foundation took place on 4 December 1948 in the Titania palace, the film theater with the biggest hall available in the western sectors of Berlin. Attendants of the event were not only scientists, politicians (the Governing Mayor Ernst Reuter amongst others) and students, but also representatives of American universities, among them Stanford University and Yale University. The first elected president of the Free University of Berlin was the historian Friedrich Meinecke.

By 1949, the Free University had registered 4,946 students. Until the construction of the Berlin Wall in 1961, many students came from the Soviet sector, often supported through the "Währungsstipendium" of the senate.

On 26 June 1963, the same day he delivered his Ich bin ein Berliner speech at Rathaus Schöneberg, John F. Kennedy was awarded honorary citizen status by the Free University and gave a ceremonial speech in front of the Henry Ford building, in which he addressed the future of Berlin and Germany under the consideration of the motto of the FU. Amongst the attendant crowd are also the Governing Mayor of Berlin Willy Brandt and the Chancellor of Germany Konrad Adenauer. His brother, Robert F. Kennedy visited the university in 1962 for the first time and in June 1964 for receiving his honorary degree from the Department of Philosophy. The speech he held at the event was dedicated to John F. Kennedy, who was assassinated the year before.

In the late 1960s, the Free University of Berlin was one of the main scenes of the German student movement of 68 as a reaction to the global student protests during that time. Significant issues included better living standards and education at the university, the Vietnam War, the presence of former Nazi Party members in the government as epitomized by the Globke affair, and continuing institutional authoritarianism. After the assassination of student Benno Ohnesorg and the attempt on the life of Rudi Dutschke, protests quickly escalated to violence throughout Germany. The events of the 68-movement provided the impulse for more openness, equality, and democracy in German society.

During the 1970s and the 1980s, the university became a "Massenuniversität" (mass/mega university) with 50,298 registered students in 1983. After reunification, the Free University of Berlin was the second-largest university in Germany (after the Ludwig Maximilian University of Munich) with 62,072 students in the winter term of 1991/92. Shortly thereafter, the senate of Berlin decided to drastically reduce enrollment until 2003, the number of students shrank to 43,885 in the winter term of 2002/03.

Since 2000, the Free University of Berlin has revamped itself. The university's research performance increased markedly with regard to the number of graduates, PhDs granted, and publications.

Since 2000

Since 2003, the FU Berlin has been regrouping its research capacities into interdisciplinary research focus areas called clusters.
Due to financial cutbacks and restructuring of medical schools in the same year, the medical institutions of the Free and Humboldt Universities of Berlin merged to create a joint department, the Charité – Universitätsmedizin Berlin.

The year 2007 was another crucial year for the Free University of Berlin as it was the university with the most approved funding applications in the German Universities Excellence Initiative, and it is now one of nine elite German universities to receive funding for its future development strategy. In the same year, Free University of Berlin dedicated a monument to the founding students who were murdered during the protests. The university presents its Freedom Award to personalities who have made a special contribution toward the cause of freedom. The university received a total of 108 million euros from the Excellence Initiative for its approved projects between 2007 and 2012.

Based on its founding tradition, the Free University of Berlin seal to this day bears the Latin terms for Truth, Justice, and Liberty. The designer of the seal was art historian and former president of the Free University of Berlin, Edwin Redslob.

Campuses

Campus Dahlem

Most of the facilities of Free University of Berlin are located in the residential garden district of Dahlem in southwestern Berlin.
Around the beginning of the 20th century, Dahlem was established as a center for research of the highest caliber. Academic activity in Dahlem was supported by Friedrich Althoff, Ministerial Director in the Prussian Ministry of Culture, who initially proposed the foundation of a "German Oxford".

The first new buildings housed government science agencies and new research institutes of the University of Berlin. The Kaiser Wilhelm Society – forerunner of the present-day Max Planck Society – was founded in 1911 and established several institutes in Dahlem.

A dynamic group of researchers carried out pioneering research resulting in numerous Nobel Prizes. Since its foundation, the Free University of Berlin has been using buildings formerly belonging to the Kaiser Wilhelm Society and, in addition, has added numerous architecturally innovative buildings.

The Free University of Berlin central campus consists of building ensembles within walking distance of each other (about 1.5 km radius). The planners oriented themselves along the type of campus found in the United States – a novelty in post-war Germany. The first independent structure to be completed on campus was the Henry Ford building, funded by the Ford Foundation. To that point, the university was housed in several older structures around the neighborhood, including the Otto Hahn building, which houses the Department of Biochemistry to this day. Thanks to further donations from the United States, Free University of Berlin was able to construct several new central building complexes including the Benjamin Franklin university clinic complex.

The largest single complex of university buildings is the Rost- und Silberlaube, which translates roughly to the "Rust and Silver Lodges". This complex consists of a series of interlinked structures corresponding to either a deep bronze (hence, "rust") or shiny white ("silver") hue, surrounding a variety of leafy courtyards. It has been complemented in 2005 by a new centerpiece, the brain-shaped Philological Library, designed by British architect Lord Norman Foster. 

With 43 ha and around 22,000 species of plants, FU's Berlin Botanical Garden in nearby Lichterfelde West is one of the largest of its kind.

Transportation 
The main campus in Dahlem is well connected to central Berlin by public transportation. The stations Dahlem Dorf and Freie Universität (Thielplatz) connect the university to the Berlin U-Bahn system's U3 line. The Lichterfelde West station of the S1 line of the Berlin S-Bahn connects the university to Berlin Mitte.

Geocampus Lankwitz
The campus in Lankwitz, formerly part of a teacher training college, is now home to the department of earth sciences and a part of the university archives. Until their move to Dahlem in 2008, the Institute for Media and Communication Studies was located there.

Campus Düppel
Most of the divisions of the Department of Veterinary Medicine are based in Düppel. It is 2 km southwest of the main campus and consists of numerous clinics and institutes, amongst them a small animal clinic, a clinic for horses and an institute of poultry diseases.

Campus Benjamin Franklin
Since the formation of the FU in 1948, it has used public hospitals as part of the medical faculty. Between 1959 and 1969, the "Steglitz Clinic", located in Lichterfelde West about 3 km southeast of Dahlem, was built with large financial supports of the United States. The medical center became one of the biggest European medical establishments unifying all institutes, clinics and lecture halls. In honor of the support by the United States, the clinic was renamed "University Clinic Benjamin Franklin". In 1994, it consists of 36 scientific institutes and 1,200 hospital beds. After the merger in 2003, it became part of the Charité medical school.

Academic environment

Today, the district of Dahlem is a hotspot for research and culture: Beside several institutes of the Max Planck Society (amongst others: The Max Planck Institute for Research in Education (MPIB), the MPI for the History of Science, the MPI for Molecular Genetics, the Fritz Haber Institute (FHI) working in the fields of molecular physics and physical chemistry and the archive of the MPG), the campus is home to the Zuse Institute Berlin as well as some federal institutions like the Federal Institute for Materials Research (BAM) and the Federal Institute for Risk Assessment (BfR).

The Berlin Geography Society founded in 1828, the Berlin University for Professional Studies and the German Archeological Institute (DAI) are also located on the campus. In addition, Dahlem is an important location for the Berlin State Museums group, housing the Ethnological Museum of Berlin and the Museum of Asian Art.

Student Village

During the 1960s, a student village with 27 buildings was constructed near Schlachtensee lake serving as housing opportunities for students.

Libraries

With an inventory of 8.5 million volumes and over 25,000 journals distributed in the central university library (UB) and 49 specialized libraries of the institutes, the library system of the FU is the largest in Germany. Items published since 1990 are fully digitalized and accessible through an OPAC. The UB is granted the status United Nations Depository Library and is linked to the global library system of the UN under direction of the Dag Hammarskjöld Library in New York. The European Union also uses the UB as a European Documentation Center. As part of the library of the UN and the EU, it contains all publications of the UN General Assembly, the UN Security Council, the International Court of Justice as well as publications from the Council of Europe and the Organization for Security and Co-operation in Europe.

Although the UB is generally a lending library, some smaller libraries of the departments are so called Präsenzbibliotheken, where students are only able to read books or journals.
Since 2005, the FU creates a new library with about 12,250 m2 of usable space. It is planned to include all libraries of the natural science departments and the smaller institutes in the humanities (e.g. Egyptology). The projected costs are around 51 million euros. Construction work started in March 2012 with plans on finishing at the end of 2014.

Organisation and governance

Administration
The executive board consists of the president (Prof. Dr. Günter M. Ziegler), an executive vice president (Prof. Dr. Klaus Hoffmann-Holland) and three other vice presidents, as well as the Director of Administration and Finance (Dr.-Ing. Andrea Bör).
There are also supporting offices for Public Affairs and the General Counsel for legal affairs.

There are currently eight central service institutions (ZE) of the FU:
 Botanical Garden Berlin and Botanical Museum Berlin
 Center for Academic Advising, Career and Counselling Services
 Center for Continuing Studies
 Center for Recreational Sports
 Center for the Promotion of Woman's and Gender Studies
 Computing Services (ZEDAT)
 Language Center
 Academic library

The ISQ ("Institut für Schulqualität der Länder Berlin und Brandenburg", Institute for Quality of Schools in Berlin and Brandenburg) is an independent facility on the campus. It consults local schools and the senate to achieve and develop a high standard of school quality in Berlin and Brandenburg and closely cooperates with the Department of Education and Psychology of the FU.

The Collegium Musicum of Free University of Berlin was founded during the first semester in 1948/49. Under conductor Karl Forster, it merged with the ensemble of the Technical University Berlin in 1954. Today, the Collegium Musicum has around 500 members from all fields of studies who spend their leisure time making music. It currently consists of five ensembles: a big choir, a chamber choir, two symphony orchestras and a big band. There are frequently events on which the Collegium Musicum plays, for instance on ceremonies.

Structure
With 12 departments (FB) and three interdisciplinary central institutes, the university can be seen as an universitas litterarum (a traditional university where studies in all basic sciences is possible).

Department of Biology, Chemistry, Pharmacy
 The department is split into three different institutes: The Institute of Biology, which specializes primarily in molecular botany, microbiology, neurobiology, ecological processes and biodiversity, the Institute of Chemistry and Biochemistry, where research is focused on structural formation, function and chemical reactivity, stereoselective/macromolecular synthesis and molecular, medical and structural biochemistry and the Institute of Pharmacy, the largest pharmaceutical training facility in Germany.

Department of Earth Sciences
The department is divided into the Institute of Geographical Sciences, the Institute of Geological Sciences and the Institute of Meteorology. Research focuses mainly on the interactive physical, chemical, and biological processes taking place within the Earth, on the Earth's surface, and the Earth's atmosphere, as well as on the interactions between humans and the environment.
 Since 1954, the Institute of Meteorology is the institution that names the low and high pressure systems in central Europe, comparably to the National Weather Service in the US.
Department of History and Cultural Studies, which consists of eight subunits, the Friedrich Meinecke Institute of History, the Art History Department, the Department of Ancient Studies, the Department of East Asia and the Middle East, the Institute of Jewish Studies, the Seminar for Catholic Theology, the Institute of Comparative Ethics and the Institute for the Scientific Study of Religion
Department of Law
The Department of Law is organized into three academic units: civil law/private law, criminal law and public law. Key topics of research in legal studies include Europeanization and international interlinking of law, with emphases in the European and international law and comparative law, but also in the international economic and regulatory law, the law in social practice and age and demographic change within the field of law.
School of Business and Economics, which contains two academic units
Business Administration, which is divided into the departments of Finance, Accounting and Taxation, Information Systems, Management and Marketing
Economics consisting of the departments of Economic Policy, Economic Theory, Public Economics and Statistics/Econometrics
Department of Mathematics and Computer Science
 The department consists of the Institute of Mathematics and the Institute of Computer Science. The department is the only one in the Berlin-Brandenburg region offering degree programs in Bioinformatics. Research activities of the Institute of Mathematics focus on numerical mathematics, algebra, analysis, discrete mathematics and geometry, cooperating with the Institute of Computer Science, which focuses in the fields of artificial intelligence, robotics, scientific computing, telematics and information processing in neural and computer networks.
The "FU-Fighters", a team of scientists and students of the Institute of Computer Science developing autonomous football-playing robots, were very successful in the international RoboCup competition, placing second in 1999, 2000 and 2003. They won in the "smallsize" league in 2004 and 2005. Since 2006, the "FUmanoids" team are competing in the category "humanoid kidsize" and placed second in the 2009 and 2010 RoboCup, winning the "Technical Challenge" in 2010.
Department of Education and Psychology
The Department of Education consists of 19 subdivisions and lies its emphasis in research on the anthropology of education, empirical research on education, schooling, and classroom instruction, school development research and intercultural education studies.
The Department of Psychology is split into 16 subunits with a wide spectrum of research.
Department of Philosophy and Humanities
The department contains the Institute of Philosophy, the Institute of Greek and Latin Languages and Literatures, the Peter Szondi Institute of Comparative Literature, the Institute of German and Dutch Languages and Literatures, the Institute of Romance Languages and Literatures, the Institute of English Language and Literature, the Institute of Theater Studies and the Institute of Arts and Media Management.
Department of Physics
Traditionally rooted in fundamental research, the Department of Physics is divided into the institutes of experimental physics, theoretical physics and physics education. Major areas of focus in the research activities within the department are solid-state physics, cluster physics, surface physics, biophysics and physics education.
Department of Political and Social Science
The Otto-Suhr-Institute for Political Science is the biggest and most reputable political science institution in Germany.
Divided into nine units, research at the Institute of Media and Communication Studies focuses on media change, uncertainty, crisis, and risk communication and political communication and transformation of the public sphere.
Institute of Sociology and the Institute for Social and Cultural Anthropology
Medical School Charité – Universitätsmedizin Berlin
The joint department with the Humboldt University Berlin is now one of Europe's largest university hospitals.
Department of Veterinary Medicine
The department is one of five sites in Germany offering veterinary education and training and contains 20 academic units. The veterinary research performed within the department traditionally lies in emphasis especially on food safety and product quality in foods from animal sources.

Despite the variety of subjects, apart from computer science, studies in the field of engineering can only be done at the Technical University or universities of applied science (Fachhochschulen).

Interdisciplinary Central Institutes
John F. Kennedy Institute for North American Studies
Institute for East European Studies
Institute for Latin American Studies

Academics

Admissions
With 33,000 applicants for the undergraduate programs (Bachelor) in 2013, admissions at Free University of Berlin remain highly competitive as the university only offers about 4,300 places each year. Due to the high numbers of applicants, most undergraduate programs at Free University of Berlin have limitations determined through the NC.
The general deadline for students directly from high school applying to limited programs in the coming winter semester is 15 July every year at all universities in Germany.

In some cases (especially Medicine, Psychology and Political Science), the NC every year is as high as 1.0 (see Grades in Germany and Abitur).
Critical applicants which just scored slightly below the NC can be invited to a selective interview or an entry exam, depending on the department/faculty.
Applicants at Charité medical school who do not directly fulfill the NC-criteria have to pass an entry exam, which covers the basic fields of Mathematics, Biology, Chemistry and Physics in addition to passing a selective interview. Both results are then added to the Abitur grade. The final decision depends on the results of the competitors.

Teaching and learning

Free University of Berlin operates on a semester calendar where the winter term begins on 1 October and ends on 31 March. The exact same model can be found at almost every university in Germany. The time where lectures are being held varies each year, normally beginning around mid-October and ending as early as mid-February.
Free University of Berlin offers a broad spectrum of subjects in over 190 degree programs. A speciality of the FU is the possibility to study a vast number of "small subjects" (e.g. theater and film studies, Egyptology, Byzantine studies, Jewish studies, Turkology, Sinology, Communication studies, Meteorology, Bioinformatics, Biochemistry) with a high level of specialization. Due to the Bologna process, most of the undergraduate programs are now leading to the three-year Bachelor's degree with 180 ECTS. At Free University of Berlin, Bachelor programs are generally divided into three categories: a regular Bachelor called "Mono-Bachelor", a combined Bachelor ("Kombi-Bachelor") consisting of two fields of studies and a combined Bachelor with a teaching option. Besides the core subject(s), all students are required to complete a series of courses related to general professional skills (ABV).
The old Diplom and Magister artium programs are still running, but do not accept new admissions anymore. In the fields of Medicine, Veterinary Medicine, Dentistry, Pharmacy and the law, students enroll in programs with Staatsexamen. Free University of Berlin also offers a variety of graduate degrees, from the master's degree to doctoral degrees.

Apart from the regular Master's programs, there are a variety of international programs taught in English, especially in the life sciences.

Free University of Berlin does not charge any tuition fees in the classical sense. Since 2003, public universities in Berlin introduced the model of semester contributions (Semesterbeiträge). It consists of an enrollment/re-registration fee, a contribution to the student union (Studentenwerk), a contribution for the student government and the fee for the semester ticket (public transportation pass) for the current semester. The fees for the semester ticket is defined by a contract with the local transportation company, the Verkehrsverbund Berlin-Brandenburg and allows students to move freely in the ABC zones of Berlin. In the winter semester of 2013/14, students are required to pay €285.83 in total.
Since 2011, Free University of Berlin participates in the national "Germany Scholarship" program organized by the federal government, universities and numerous private companies. Highly talented and committed students can get €300 monthly.

Research
In terms of external endowments by the DFG, Free University of Berlin ranks third behind the RWTH Aachen University and LMU Munich. Between 2009 and 2013, 289 foreign guest researchers came to the university through fellowships granted by the renowned Alexander von Humboldt Foundation, making the FU the most popular destination for foreign researchers in Germany.

In the field of natural sciences, research focuses on basic research with a strong emphasis on interdisciplinarity, whereas research in the humanities focuses on the current economical, political and cultural development of society (transformation processes, effects of globalization and environmental politics).
In the field of Earth sciences, the FU has contributed to various aeronautical missions, e.g. the Mars Express and the Cassini-Huygens to Saturn.

Excluding the Charité medical school, which is co-administered by the university with the Humboldt University, Free University of Berlin is currently the lead university for eight collaborative research centers of the German Research Foundation and also has five DFG research units. It is part of the Berlin University Alliance.

Interdisciplinary centers
 "Ancient World"
 "Art and Aesthetics"
 "Ecosystem Dynamics in Central Asia"
 "Efficient Mathematical modeling"
 "European Languages: Structures – Development – Comparison" (ZEUS)
 "Historical Anthropology"
 "Middle Ages – Renaissance – Early Modern Times"
 "Research on Teaching and Learning"
 "Social and Cultural History of the Middle East"
 "Berlin Center for European Studies (BEST)"
 "Berlin Center for Caspian Region Studies"
 "The Center for Modern Greece (Centrum Modernes Griechenland/CeMoG)"

Graduate schools
 Berlin Mathematical School
 Graduate School of North American Studies
 Friedrich Schlegel Graduate School of Literary Studies
 Muslim Cultures and Societies
 Berlin-Brandenburg School for Regenerative Therapies
 Berlin School of Integrative Oncology
 Graduate School of East Asian Studies

Clusters of Excellence
 Languages of Emotion
 Topoi – The Formation and Transformation of Space and Knowledge in Ancient Civilizations
 NeuroCure – Towards a Better Outcome of Neurological Disorders
 Unifying Concepts in Catalysis (together with the TU Berlin, HU Berlin and the University of Potsdam)

As part of the MATHEON – Mathematics for Key Technologies research center of the DFG, Free University of Berlin together with the TU Berlin, HU Berlin and the Zuse Institute Berlin is working on mathematical modeling, simulation and optimization of real-world processes.

Twice every year, the "Dahlem Conferences" are held at Free University of Berlin. Over the course of one week, international renowned scientists and Nobel laureates come together and discuss current problems in all fields of studies.

The annual "Einstein Lectures Dahlem" hosted by the university and several external institutions since 2005 are dedicated to Albert Einstein, who was the director of the Kaiser Wilhelm Institute of Physics for more than 15 years. It is an colloquium which presents fields in science which were influenced by Einstein's thinking.

Rankings

The 2022 British QS World University Rankings ranked the university 130th internationally, with the Political science program at Otto Suhr Institute being the top rated in Germany and no. 4 in Europe. The 2020 QS WUR for law and legal studies ranked the FU at 51-100th internationally, 3rd in Germany and 17th best in Europe. In the QS WUR 2014, Free University of Berlin was placed at the 81–90 slot being the fifth German university ranked in the list.

In 2020, the American U.S. News & World Report listed Free University of Berlin as the 111th best in the world, climbing five positions. Being among the 100 best in the world in 18 areas of 28 ranked.

According to the British Times Higher Education World University Rankings 2022 the FU Berlin ranks 83rd globally and seventh in Germany.

In the German "ExcellenceRanking" of the CHE (Center for Higher Education Development) in 2013, Free University of Berlin ranks top in the fields of Biology, Chemistry, Physics and Political science. In the CHE "SubjectRanking", Freie Universität has been evaluated as one of Germany's best universities in Earth sciences, Computer science and Philosophy and also ranks among the Top 5 in Psychology, English studies and Education.

Because of an unresolved dispute over the Nobel laureates before the Second World War (both Humboldt and Free University of Berlin claim to be the rightful successor of the University of Berlin), they do not appear in the Academic Ranking of World Universities (ARWU), anymore. The last ARWU, also known as Shanghai Ranking, placed the FU at 83rd in the world in 2007.

Global partnerships
Free University of Berlin maintains wide-ranging international contacts with top universities and organizations which provide key impulses for research and teaching. In the 1950s, the Free University of Berlin had already established partnerships with leading universities in the United States such as the University of California System (including the University of California, Berkeley, the University of California, Los Angeles and the University of California, Santa Cruz), the University of Chicago, Cornell University, Stanford University (which also has a small campus within the FU), Duke University, Princeton University, Yale University, and Columbia University, as well as with Western European universities such as the University of Oxford, the University of Cambridge, University College London, the University of Sussex and the École Normale Supérieure in Paris.

The university is a founding member of the global educational center for the study of transnational law, the Centre for Transnational Legal Studies in London.
First contacts with universities in Eastern Europe were made in the 1970s. In the 1990s, links were in particular extended to include growing numbers of institutions in Canada (McGill University, University of Alberta, York University), Eastern Europe, and the Far East (China: Peking University, Fudan University, Nanjing University, Shanghai Jiao Tong University; Japan: University of Tokyo, Kyoto University, Nagoya University, Waseda University; South Korea: Korea University, Yonsei University, Seoul National University). The newly established Centre for International Cooperation (CIC) concentrates on identifying new strategic partners for international projects.

Today, Free University of Berlin has established over 400 partnerships in five continents, many of them as part of the European ERASMUS program.
Every year, about 600 visiting scientists contribute to the university teaching and research. For the grant programs in Germany, the Free University of Berlin is one of the first choices both for the ERASMUS and Tempus as well as for the Fulbright program and the international programs of the German Academic Exchange Service (DAAD).
An International Summer and Winter University (FUBiS) has been set up for international students offering (semi-)intensive German courses and numerous subject courses.

International branch offices
The Free University of Berlin operates foreign branch offices in New York City, Brussels, Moscow, Beijing, Cairo, São Paulo, and New Delhi. The foreign branch offices work to expand upon cooperation partnerships already existing with universities in the country.

In April 2005, the Free University of Berlin, in conjunction with Ludwig-Maximilians-Universität (LMU Munich), opened a joint representative office in New York. This German University Alliance, located in German House, the seat of the German Consulate General and the German UN Mission, represents the interests of the two universities in the United States and Canada and works to increase the exchange of students and scientists.

In addition, the Free University of Berlin, as the first German institution of higher education, founded an alumni and fundraising organization, the Friends of the Freie Universität Berlin (FFUB) in New York. Since 2003 this organization has maintained close contact with alumni and scientists of the Free University of Berlin in the U.S. and attempts to gain alumni and friends as sponsors, to strengthen the long-lasting trans-Atlantic relations. Some of the proceeds from these fundraising activities were contributed to the renovation of the Henry Ford Building.

In April 2006 Peking University opened its first branch in Germany. Its objectives include the promotion of knowledge of Chinese culture, the cultivation of Chinese-German cooperation, and the spread of the Chinese language. Duke University in Durham, North Carolina, has a Berlin program (Duke in Berlin) that is held in cooperation with the Free University of Berlin and Humboldt University. The University of California System organizes programs for American students in Berlin and Potsdam. The UC System maintains an office at the Free University of Berlin to attend to the needs of exchange students from the California campuses.

The Office of Global Programs of Columbia University in New York administrates the Berlin Consortium for German Studies. Students from Columbia University and the other colleges and universities included in the consortium (University of Chicago, Cornell University, Johns Hopkins University, University of Pennsylvania, Princeton University, and Vassar College) can attend classes at the Free University of Berlin for one or two semesters as external students. This temporary enrollment is preceded by a six-week intensive language program.

Notable people

Alumni of the Free University of Berlin include several scientists, philosophers and politicians, amongst them five Nobel Prize winners and 15 Leibniz laureates.

See also

Universities and research institutions in Berlin
Humboldt University of Berlin
Technical University of Berlin
University of Potsdam
List of split up universities

References

External links
Official website

 
Universities and colleges in Berlin
Buildings and structures in Steglitz-Zehlendorf
Educational institutions established in 1948
1948 establishments in Germany
Creative Commons books publishing companies